Schwarzbach is a river located in Bavaria, Germany. It is a left tributary of the Günz near Ellzee.

See also
List of rivers of Bavaria

Rivers of Bavaria
Rivers of Germany